EverTrust Bank is an overseas Chinese bank in the United States.  Headquartered in City of Industry , California with branch offices in City of Industry, Alhambra, Irvine, Cerritos, Cupertino, Arcadia, and Milpitas, it is privately held and was established on May 3, 1995. EverTrust Bank is a subsidiary of O-Bank.

In comparison to other overseas Chinese banks in the United States established earlier, this bank originally served newly arrived immigrants at its inception.  As a local community bank, the expansion of the EverTrust Bank mirrored the diffusion of the Chinese immigrants in Orange County, California, and its new client base in the upscale neighborhood is generally wealthier than other immigrants.

EverTrust Bank was established in 1995 by a group of overseas Chinese bankers and entrepreneurs. In July 2006, O-Bank reached an agreement with the Bank to purchase 100% stake of the Bank via a newly established U.S. holding company, IBT Holdings Corp. The acquisition was consummated on March 30, 2007.

Presently, the Bank focuses on serving businesses and consumer customers in California providing C&I, trade finance, insurance products, residential mortgage, small business loans, commercial real estate and construction loans as well as deposit services. As of December 2019, EverTrust Bank had assets of US$945 million.

References

External links
 EverTrust Bank

Companies based in Los Angeles County, California
Banks based in California
Banks established in 1995
Privately held companies based in California
Chinese American banks